"Ballad of Youth" is a song by American rock singer/guitarist Richie Sambora, released as the first single from his first solo album Stranger in This Town in 1991. The song reached number 63 on the U.S. Billboard Hot 100 and number 59 in the UK. The single featured a music video.

Track listing 
12-inch single (UK) (MERX350 – fold-out poster sleeve)
 "Ballad of Youth"  
 "Wind Cries Mary"
 "Rest In Peace"

Charts

References

1991 singles
Songs written by Richie Sambora
1991 songs
Mercury Records singles
Richie Sambora songs